The Islander 36, sometimes referred to as the I36, is an American sailboat that was designed by Alan Gurney as a cruiser and first built in 1971.

Production
The design was built by Islander Yachts/Tradewind Yachts in the United States from 1971 until 1986 with 770 boats completed, but it is now out of production.

The molds were purchased by Newport Offshore Yachts in 1986 but it is not known if any further boats were built.

Design

The Islander 36 is a recreational keelboat, built predominantly of fiberglass, with wood trim. It has a masthead sloop rig; a raked stem; a raised counter, reverse transom; a skeg-mounted rudder controlled by a wheel and a fixed fin keel. The fin keel model displaces  and carries  of lead ballast, while the shoal draft keel model displaces  and carries  of lead ballast.

A tall mast was also available for sailing in areas with lighter winds.

The boat was fitted with a large variety of inboard engines for docking and maneuvering, including the Universal Atomic 4 and the Palmer P-60 gasoline engines, the British Perkins Engines 4-108, Westerbeke L-25, Pathfinder and Japanese Yanmar diesel engines.

The design has sleeping accommodation for six people, with a double "V"-berth in the bow cabin and two straight settees in the main cabin that can be converted to doubles. The galley is located on the starboard side just forward of the companionway ladder and is equipped with a three-burner stove and a double sink. A navigation station is opposite the galley, on the port side. The head is located just aft of the bow cabin on the port side.

Operational history
The boat is supported by an active class club that organizes racing events, the Islander 36 Association.

In a 2010 review in Talk of The Dock, stated, "the Islander 36 (I36) is a true classic ... and they’re great boats that will go the distance or race quite impressively"

See also

List of sailing boat types

Similar sailboats
Beneteau 361
C&C 36-1
C&C 36R
C&C 110
Catalina 36
Columbia 36
Coronado 35
CS 36
Ericson 36
Frigate 36
Hunter 36
Hunter 36-2
Hunter 36 Legend
Hunter 36 Vision
Nonsuch 36
Portman 36
S2 11.0
Seidelmann 37
Watkins 36
Watkins 36C

References

External links

Keelboats
1970s sailboat type designs
Sailing yachts
Sailboat type designs by Alan Gurney
Sailboat types built by Islander Yachts